Guido Marcelo Carrillo (born 25 May 1991) is an Argentine professional footballer who currently plays as a striker for Estudiantes.

Club career

Estudiantes
Carrillo played for Estudiantes for most of his early professional career. He was a fan favourite at the Estadio Ciudad de La Plata, having graduated through the youth academy and making his first-team debut in 2011. In February 2015, Estudiantes beat Barcelona Guayaquil 2–0 in their Libertadores Cup opener, played at La Plata “Único” stadium. Guido Carrillo scored three times for the “Pincha”, giving Estudiantes their first three points in the tournament.

Monaco
On 3 July 2015, Monaco announced the signing of Carrillo on a five-year contract. His former club Estudiantes had previously stated it had agreed a $10 million transfer offer (about €8.8 million). He scored his first goal for the club in a 3–1 away win over BSC Young Boys in the third qualifying round of the season's Champions League.

Southampton 
On 25 January 2018, Carrillo joined Premier League side Southampton for a fee reported to be in the region of £19 million on a three-and-a-half-year deal. He made his first appearance on 27 January as an 80th-minute substitute in a 1–0 victory over Watford in the FA Cup.

On 8 July 2018, Carrillo rejoined former manager Mauricio Pellegrino, when he joined CD Leganés on a season-long loan. On 1 September 2019, he was loaned again to the same club until the end of 2019–20 season. He failed to make much of an impact during his second season with Leganés as the club were relegated from La Liga.

Elche
On 5 October 2020, Carrillo joined Spanish side Elche CF on a free transfer after an agreement was reached to terminate his contract with Southampton where he made just ten appearances for the club.

Henan Songshan Longmen F.C.
On 30 August 2022, Carrillo completed a move to Chinese Super League club Henan Songshan Longmen on a free transfer.

Career statistics

Club
.

Honours
Monaco
Ligue 1: 2016–17

References

External links

Living people
1991 births
Association football forwards
Argentine footballers
Argentine expatriate footballers
Argentine Primera División players
Estudiantes de La Plata footballers
Ligue 1 players
Championnat National 2 players
AS Monaco FC players
Premier League players
Southampton F.C. players
La Liga players
CD Leganés players
Elche CF players
Argentine expatriate sportspeople in Monaco
Argentine expatriate sportspeople in England
Argentine expatriate sportspeople in Spain
Expatriate footballers in Monaco
Expatriate footballers in England
Expatriate footballers in Spain
Sportspeople from Buenos Aires Province